These are the official results of the Men's Javelin Throw event at the 1987 World Championships in Rome, Italy. There were a total of 37 participating athletes, with the final held on Sunday August 30, 1987. All results were made with rough surfaced javelin (old design). The qualification mark was set at 79.00 metres.

Medalists

Schedule
All times are Central European Time (UTC+1)

Abbreviations
All results shown are in metres

Records

Qualification

Group A

Group B

Final

See also
 1984 Men's Olympic Javelin Throw (Los Angeles)
 1986 Men's European Championships Javelin Throw (Stuttgart)
 1988 Men's Olympic Javelin Throw (Seoul)
 1990 Men's European Championships Javelin Throw (Split)

References
 Results
 IAAF Results
 koti.welho

J
Javelin throw at the World Athletics Championships